The men's Greco-Roman 68 kilograms at the 1996 Summer Olympics as part of the wrestling program were held at the Georgia World Congress Center from July 20 to July 21. The gold and silver medalists were determined by the final match of the main single-elimination bracket. The losers advanced to the repechage. These matches determined the bronze medalist for the event.

Results

Round 1

Round 2

Round 3

Round 4

Round 5

Round 6

Finals

Final standing

References

External links
Official Report

Greco-Roman 68kg